SMEI may refer to:

 Severe myoclonic epilepsy of infancy (SMEI), also known as Dravet's syndrome, a form of generalized epilepsy with febrile seizures plus.
 Borderline SMEI (SMEB), a related condition to the above.
 The Solar Mass Ejection Imager aboard the Coriolis satellite.

See also 
 Smei, a village near Costeşti, Romania
 Sales & Marketing Executives International